Harmologa is a genus of moths belonging to the subfamily Tortricinae of the family Tortricidae.

Species
Harmologa amplexana (Zeller, 1875)
Harmologa arenicolor Diakonoff, 1953
Harmologa columella Meyrick, 1927
Harmologa festiva Philpott, 1915
Harmologa oblongana (Walker, 1863)
Harmologa petrias Meyrick, 1902
Harmologa pontifica Meyrick, 1911
Harmologa reticularis Philpott, 1915
Harmologa sanguinea Philpott, 1915
Harmologa scoliastis (Meyrick, 1907)
Harmologa sisyrana Meyrick, 1883
Harmologa speciosa (Philpott, 1927)
Harmologa toroterma Hudson, 1925

See also
List of Tortricidae genera

References

 , 1882, Descriptions of New Zealand Micro-Lepidoptera. Trans. New Zealand Inst. 15: 44.
 , 1910, A Revision of the Classification of New Zealand Tortricina. Trans. New Zealand Inst., 43: 85.
 , 2005, World Catalogue of Insects 5.
  Catalogue of the Generic Names Used in Tortricidae (Lepidoptera). Kraków, 1977. Acta Zoologica Cracoviensia. 22(6): 290.

External links
lotterysambad.live
vipomod.com

Archipini
Tortricidae genera